Annual percentage yield (APY) is a normalized representation of an interest rate, based on a compounding period of one year. APY figures allow a reasonable, single-point comparison of different offerings with varying compounding schedules. However, it does not account for the possibility of account fees affecting the net gain. APY generally refers to the rate paid to a depositor by a financial institution, while the analogous annual percentage rate (APR) refers to the rate paid to a financial institution by a borrower.

To promote financial products that do not involve debt, banks and other firms will often quote the APY (as opposed to the APR because the APY represents the customer receiving a higher return at the end of the term). For example, a certificate of deposit that has a 4.65% APR, compounded monthly, would instead be quoted as a 4.75% APY.

Equation
One common mathematical definition of APY uses this effective interest rate formula, but the precise usage may depend on local laws.

 

where 
  is the nominal interest rate and
  is the number of compounding periods per year.

For large N we have

where e is the base of natural logarithms (the formula follows the definition of e as a limit). This is a reasonable approximation if the compounding is daily. Also, it is worth noting that a nominal interest rate and its corresponding APY are very nearly equal when they are small. For example (fixing some large N), a nominal interest rate of 100% would have an APY of approximately 171%, whereas 5% corresponds to 5.12%, and 1% corresponds to 1.005%.

United States
For financial institutions in the United States, the calculation of the APY and the related annual percentage yield earned are regulated by the FDIC Truth in Savings Act of 1991:

The calculation method is defined as

 

Algebraically, this is equivalent to

 

Here
 "principal" is the amount of funds assumed to have been deposited at the beginning of the account,
 "interest" is the total dollar amount of interest earned on the Principal for the term of the account,
 "days in term" is the actual number of days in the term of the account.

See also
Annual equivalent rate
Compound interest
Effective interest rate

References

United States federal banking legislation
1991 in law
Interest rates